Carlos Mario Grisales (born 24 August 1966) is a retired Colombian long-distance runner who specialized in the marathon. He is a two-time Olympian.

Achievements

Personal bests
Half marathon - 1:02:43 hours (1997)
Marathon - 2:11:17 hours (1996)

References

External links

sports-reference

1966 births
Living people
Colombian male long-distance runners
Athletes (track and field) at the 1992 Summer Olympics
Athletes (track and field) at the 1996 Summer Olympics
Olympic athletes of Colombia
Colombian male marathon runners
20th-century Colombian people